Dinajpur District may refer to:

 Dinajpur District, Bangladesh
 West Dinajpur district, West Bengal, India. It was split in 1992 into:
 Dakshin Dinajpur district
 Uttar Dinajpur district